Schlossplatz is the largest square in Stuttgart Mitte and home to the Neues Schloss which was built between 1746 and 1807. From its construction until the mid-1800s it was used as a military parade ground and not open to general public use. It stands next to two other popular squares in Stuttgart: Karlsplatz to the south and Schillerplatz to the south west. The Königstraße (King Street) bisects the plaza from north to south.

The Neues Schloss Palace and grounds have been public property since 1918.

Along with much of Stuttgart Mitte, Neues Schloss was heavily damaged during the Allied Bombing of World War II and the building was restored from 1958-1964 with a modernized interior that houses the ministries of Culture and the Treasury for the government of Baden-Württemberg.

Until the 1960s the King Street that bisects the plaza carried auto and truck traffic. Since that time the Stuttgart underground has built an underground station and tunnels were built to redirect traffic away from the plaza and Königstraße.

The entire square was last fully renovated in 1977 to mark the staging of the Bundesgartenschau (State Garden Show) in Stuttgart. The lawns and flowerbeds were renewed in 2006 following the staging of the 2006 World Cup Finals.

Public transport
 Schlossplatz lies almost directly on the B27 road.
 Bus routes 42 and 44, all 17 night buses, the U5, U6, U7, U12 and U15 lines of the Stuttgart underground stop directly on Schlossplatz.

Events
Every year Schlossplatz is home to major outdoor events such as open-air concerts, children's fairs and parts of the Weihnachten market including an outdoor ice rink. During the 2006 World Cup Finals the square regularly held more than 40,000 spectators who watched live matches on 3 huge screens.

Schlossplatz featured the United Buddy Bears exhibition in summer 2008 - an array of 144 two metre-high sculptures, each designed by a different artist, touring the world as a symbol of cultural understanding, tolerance and mutual trust.

Other images

References

External links
 Schlossplatz panorama – Interactive 360° Panorama
  Stuttgart Tourism website page on the Neues Schloss
  Stuttgart Tourism website page on the Schlossplatz.

Buildings and structures in Stuttgart
Tourist attractions in Stuttgart
Squares in Stuttgart